Gutjahr is a surname. Notable people with the surname include:

 Jeremiah Gutjahr (born 1997), American soccer player
 Nico Gutjahr (born 1993), German footballer
 Richard Gutjahr (born 1973), German journalist
 Diana Gutjahr (born 1984), Swiss politician

German-language surnames